David Worth Dennis House, also known as Woodlawn, is a historic home located at Richmond, Wayne County, Indiana.  It was built in 1895, and is a two-story, cubic, Queen Anne style brick dwelling.  It has a hipped roof with lower cross-gables and a two-story gabled wing designed by architect John A. Hasecoster and added in 1909.  It features a two-story porch and single-story porte cochere.  It's builder's grandson was U.S. Congressman David W. Dennis.

It was listed on the National Register of Historic Places in 2001.

References

Houses on the National Register of Historic Places in Indiana
Queen Anne architecture in Indiana
Houses completed in 1895
Buildings and structures in Richmond, Indiana
National Register of Historic Places in Wayne County, Indiana